Kohei Kudo may refer to:
 Kohei Kudo (footballer)
 Kohei Kudo (snowboarder)